Uttar Pradesh State Highway 25 (UP SH 25) starts from Palia (Lakhimpur) and goes to Lucknow and covers a distance of 265.50 km.

Uttar Pradesh state in India has a series of road networks.

See also
 State highway
 State Highway (India)
 Lakhimpur Kheri district
 Dudhwa National Park

References

External links
 Lakhimpur Kheri official website
 State Highway 25 on Google Maps

Transport in Lakhimpur Kheri district
State Highways in Uttar Pradesh